Frank Samuel Knox (March 29, 1910 – May 1981) was an American football guard who played three seasons with the Detroit Lions of the National Football League. He first enrolled at the University of New Hampshire before transferring to the University of Illinois. He initially attended Concord High School in Concord, New Hampshire before transferring to Phillips Exeter Academy in Exeter, New Hampshire and lastly Clark Preparatory School in Hanover, New Hampshire.

References

External links
Just Sports Stats

1910 births
1981 deaths
Players of American football from New Hampshire
American football guards
Phillips Exeter Academy alumni
New Hampshire Wildcats football players
Illinois Fighting Illini football players
Detroit Lions players
People from Bow, New Hampshire